Rhodostrophia vibicaria, the common pink-barred, is a moth of the family Geometridae. The species can be found in the Palearctic realm.

The length of the forewings is 14–16 mm. The moths fly in one or two generations from the end of May to September. 

The larvae feed on various plants and shrubs, such as Cytisus scoparius and Prunus spinosa.

Notes
The flight season refers to Belgium and the Netherlands. This may vary in other parts of the range.

External links

Fauna Europaea
Lepiforum.de
Vlindernet.nl 

Rhodostrophiini
Moths of Europe
Moths described in 1759
Taxa named by Carl Alexander Clerck

pms:Rhodostrophia calabra